Pseudomonas tolaasii is a species of Gram-negative soil bacteria that is the causal agent of bacterial blotch on cultivated mushrooms (Agaricus bisporus). It is known to produce a toxin, called tolaasin, which is responsible for the brown blotches associated with the disease. It also demonstrates hemolytic activity, causing lysis of erythrocytes. Based on 16S rRNA analysis, P. tolaasii has been placed in the P. fluorescens group.

References

External links
Type strain of Pseudomonas tolaasii at BacDive -  the Bacterial Diversity Metadatabase

Pseudomonadales
Bacteria described in 1919